The Cady (Catalan: Cadí) is a 19 km long river in the Catalan Pyrenees of southern France, near the border with eastern Spain. It rises on the slopes of the Canigou, flows through the Cadí cirque where it feeds the Cadí Lakes, and continues northward to Villefranche-de-Conflent where it empties into the Têt.

References

Rivers of France
Rivers of Occitania (administrative region)
Rivers of Pyrénées-Orientales